Wiesau is a river of Bavaria, Germany. It passes through the town Wiesau and flows into the Waldnaab near Falkenberg.

See also
List of rivers of Bavaria

References

Rivers of Bavaria
Rivers of Germany